In Greek mythology, the Crinaeae (from Greek "κρήνη") were a type of Naiad nymphs associated with fountains or wells.

The number of Crinaeae includes but is not limited to:

Aganippe
Appias
 Myrtoessa
 The Sithnides (a group of nymphs associated with a fountain in Megara)

See also
Camenae
Pegaeae

Notes

References 
Dictionary of Greek and Roman Biography and Mythology, v. 2, page 1216
Pausanias, Description of Greece with an English Translation by W.H.S. Jones, Litt.D., and H.A. Ormerod, M.A., in 4 Volumes. Cambridge, MA, Harvard University Press; London, William Heinemann Ltd. 1918. . Online version at the Perseus Digital Library
Pausanias, Graeciae Descriptio. 3 vols. Leipzig, Teubner. 1903.  Greek text available at the Perseus Digital Library.
Publius Ovidius Naso, The Art of Love (Ars Amatoria) translated by A.S. Kline. Online version at the Topos Text Project.
Publius Vergilius Maro, Eclogues. J. B. Greenough. Boston. Ginn & Co. 1895. Online version at the Perseus Digital Library.
Publius Vergilius Maro, Bucolics, Aeneid, and Georgics of Vergil. J. B. Greenough. Boston. Ginn & Co. 1900. Latin text available at the Perseus Digital Library.

Naiads